Jiangxia may refer to:

Jiangxia Commandery, administrative division in ancient China, centred around present-day Yunmeng County or Wuhan's Xinzhou District in Hubei Province
Jiangxia District, district in Wuhan, Hubei, China
Jiangxia (mammal), Chinese mesonychid from the Nongshanian division of the Upper Paleocene
Chianghsia, an extinct genus of monstersaurian platynotan lizard.